Barney is an unincorporated community in Madison County, Iowa, in the United States.

History
Barney was laid out in 1887. Barney's population was 51 in 1902, and 75 in 1925.

References

Unincorporated communities in Madison County, Iowa
Unincorporated communities in Iowa
1887 establishments in Iowa